HMS Vernon was a 50-gun fourth rate launched in 1832.  She became tender to the Navy's gunnery school , and then the torpedo school ship in 1876.  She was renamed HMS Actaeon in 1886 and sold in 1923.

References

External links
 

1832 ships
Training ships of the Royal Navy